Alec Anderson (born October 3, 1999) is an American football offensive tackle for the Buffalo Bills of the National Football League (NFL). He played college football at UCLA.

College career
Anderson played college football for UCLA from 2018 to 2021, appearing in 30 games with 17 starts.  He got his opportunity to become the starting right tackle for UCLA in 2020 when fellow lineman Jake Burton transferred to Baylor.  The previous year he played in 10 games, starting 3.

Professional career
In December 2021, Anderson declared for the NFL draft. After going undrafted in the 2022 NFL draft, he signed with the Buffalo Bills.  He was cut by the Bills during training camp but was subsequently signed to their practice squad. On January 2, 2023, Anderson was elevated to the active roster. He signed a reserve/future contract on January 23, 2023.

References

External links
Buffalo Bills bio
UCLA Bruins bio

1999 births
Living people
American football offensive tackles
UCLA Bruins football players
Buffalo Bills players

Year of birth missing (living people)